Tandur is a town in Vikarabad District in the Indian State of Telangana. It is a municipality consisting of 36 wards, as well as the headquarters of Tandur Mandal in the Tandur Revenue Division. It is known for its production of Limestone, Cement, and Redgram (Pigeon pea).
Drinking water is sourced from the River Kagna, a tributary of the Bhima River, which is 4 km from the town.
The country's famous Tandur Redgram (Pigeon pea) has been awarded the Geographical Indication (GI) by The Central Department of Commerce and Industry.
It is the first in Telugu states to get GI in terms of agricultural crops.

Transport 

The major railway station is located on the Secunderabad & Hyderabad – Wadi section of the Mumbai route. It is connected with neighboring towns like Zaheerabad (60 km), Sangareddy (95 km), Mahabubnagar (80 km), and Vikarabad (40 km) through roads and railways.

Various buses are being served by TSRTC from Tandur to towns like Mahabubnagar, Narayanpet, Vikarabad, Sadasivpet, Sangareddy, Zaheerabad, Kodangal, Kosgi, Chevella, Chincholi & cities like Mumbai and Hyderabad.

Demographics 
According to the 2011 Indian census, Tandur had a population of 71,008, including 35,695 males and 35,310 females. The literacy rate is 78% (80.07% for men, 76.03% for women), which is higher than the state average of 67.02%.

Economy 

Industries in Tandur include blue, green, and yellow-colored limestone that can be used for flooring, wall cladding, and slabs. The town is known for cement factories, including the India Cements Limited (ICL), Cement Corporation of India (CCI), Penna Cements, Chettinad Cements, and Vicat Sagar. The cement industry, stone mines, quarries, pigeon pea cultivation, and transportation are the main sources of employment.

Members of Legislative Assembly

Members of Parliament

See also
Tandur railway station

References 

 Cities and towns in Vikarabad district
 Mandal headquarters in Vikarabad district
Hybatpur Union Parishad (Bengali: হৈবতপুর ইউনিয়ন), officially spelled Haibatpur union from April 2018 is a union Parishad of Jashore Sadar Upazila, Jashore District in the Khulna, Division of Bangladesh.[1]